Burila may refer to one of two places in Mehedinți County, Romania:

Burila Mare, a commune
Burila Mică, a village in Gogoșu, Mehedinți